The Kamov Ka-18 (NATO reporting name Hog) was a Soviet four-seat utility helicopter that first flew in 1955. It was a development of the Kamov Ka-15, with a lengthened fuselage and a more powerful engine - the  Ivchenko AI-14V radial. Total production from Kamov was about 120.

Operators
 
Soviet Naval Aviation

Specifications (Ka-18)

See also

References

Citations

Bibliography
 Stroud, John. Soviet Transport Aircraft since 1945. London: Putnam, 1968. .

External links

 https://web.archive.org/web/20080322060201/http://www.aviation.ru/Ka/#18

Kamov aircraft
1950s Soviet civil utility aircraft
Kamov Ka-018
Coaxial rotor helicopters
Single-engined piston helicopters
Aircraft first flown in 1955